Eric Buchman (born September 11, 1979) is an American professional poker player from Valley Stream, New York, who finished in fourth place at the 2009 World Series of Poker Main Event. The following year, at the 2010 World Series of Poker, Buchman won his first bracelet in the $2,000 Limit Hold'em event, earning $203,607.

Career
Buchman finished in fourth place in the 2009 World Series of Poker Main Event on November 7 of that year. He part of the second group of players known as the "November Nine". Buchman has nine previous WSOP cashes, including a 2nd-place finish in the Limit Hold'em event in 2006 and a 6th-place finish in the Omaha/Seven Card Stud Hi-Low-8 or Better event in 2009. He also had a runner-up finish at the WSOP Circuit event in December 2007.

As of 2010, Buchman has finished in the money three times on the World Poker Tour and ten times in the World Series of Poker.

His total live tournament earnings have exceeded $3,700,000.

World Series of Poker bracelets

References

Further reading

 Article re' 2009 WSOP final table

External links
 Personal website
 WSOP profile

1979 births
American poker players
World Series of Poker bracelet winners
People from Valley Stream, New York
Living people